The Chan Rocks are a group of rocks along an ice bluff situated  southeast of Miller Butte in the Outback Nunataks, Victoria Land, Antarctica. They were first mapped by the United States Geological Survey from surveys and from U.S. Navy air photos, 1959–64, and named by the Advisory Committee on Antarctic Names for Lian Chan, engaged in laboratory management, McMurdo Station winter party, 1968. The geographical feature lies situated on the Pennell Coast, a portion of Antarctica lying between Cape Williams and Cape Adare.

References 

Rock formations of Victoria Land
Pennell Coast